Schischkinia is a genus of Asian flowering plants in the family Asteraceae.

Species
There is only one known species, Schischkinia albispina, native to Asia: Kazakhstan, Uzbekistan, Kyrgyzstan, Tajikistan, Xinjiang, Afghanistan, and Iran.

References

Monotypic Asteraceae genera
Flora of Asia
Cynareae
Taxa named by Alexander von Bunge